European route E 372 is a B-type road part of the International E-road network. It begins in Warsaw, Poland and ends in Lviv, Ukraine. There are often hour-long delays at the Polish-Ukrainian border.

Route 
 
 : Zakręt – Majdan
 : Majdan – Garwolin – Ryki – Kurów
 : Kurów – Lublin
 : Lublin
 : Lublin – Piaski
 : Piaski – Krasnystaw – Zamość – Tomaszów Lubelski – Hrebenne
 
 : Rava-Ruska – Lviv

References

External links 
 UN Economic Commission for Europe: Overall Map of E-road Network (2007)

372
European routes in Ukraine
E372